Telmário Mota (born February 15, 1958) is a Brazilian politician and journalist. He had represented Roraima in the Federal Senate from 2015 to 2023. He is a member of the Republican Party of the Social Order (PROS).

References

Living people
1958 births
Members of the Federal Senate (Brazil)
People from Roraima
Democratic Labour Party (Brazil) politicians
Brazilian Labour Party (current) politicians
Republican Party of the Social Order politicians